Marijke Ruiter (born 1954) is a retired Dutch swimmer who won 10 gold medals at the 1972 and 1976 Paralympic Games.

See also
Paralympic sports
Sport in the Netherlands

References

1954 births
Living people
Paralympic swimmers of the Netherlands
Swimmers at the 1972 Summer Paralympics
Swimmers at the 1976 Summer Paralympics
Wheelchair basketball players at the 1988 Summer Paralympics
Paralympic gold medalists for the Netherlands
Paralympic bronze medalists for the Netherlands
Medalists at the 1972 Summer Paralympics
Medalists at the 1976 Summer Paralympics
Medalists at the 1988 Summer Paralympics
Paralympic medalists in wheelchair basketball
Paralympic wheelchair basketball players of the Netherlands
Paralympic medalists in swimming
Dutch female freestyle swimmers
Dutch female backstroke swimmers
Dutch female breaststroke swimmers
Dutch female butterfly swimmers
Dutch female medley swimmers
20th-century Dutch women
20th-century Dutch people
21st-century Dutch women